is a former WBA Super Flyweight champion from Kitakyushu, Japan. Onizuka was an extremely popular boxer in Japan, creating a boxing boom in Japan during the early 1990s along with Joichiro Tatsuyoshi.

Biography
Onizuka began boxing in middle school, entering a local boxing gym to begin training. He won several high amateur boxing tournaments in high school, but lost a match in his senior year against Hiroshi Kawashima, who would later win the WBC Super Flyweight title. Onizuka had already been accepted to Kinki University, but decided to turn pro after being battered in a sparring session with Hiroki Ioka, who had just become the WBC Minimumweight champion. He entered the Kyoei boxing gym in Tokyo, and made his professional debut in 1988 as a flyweight.

Onizuka quickly built up his record, and won the Japanese Super Flweight title in October, 1990, which he defended three times before moving on to challenge the world title. His first world title match came in April, 1992, fighting Thanomsak Sithbaobay for the WBA Super Flyweight title, which had been vacated by legendary Thai boxer Khaosai Galaxy. Onizuka won a close 12 round decision, the first of the series of controversial wins in his career. Akinobu Hiranaka also won the WBA Super Lightweight title in Mexico the same day.

He defended his title for the first time on September 11, 1990, winning by TKO in the 5th round. This would be his only non-decision win in world title fights. He fought Mexican fighter Armando Castro three months later for his second defense, and won an indisputable victory. This fight was the height of Onizuka's career.

Onizuka's third defense came on May 21, 1993, against Korean fighter Jae-Shin Lim, who had previously fought with the alias, "Kotaro Hayashi." Onizuka was predicted to win easily, but the challenger pummeled Onizuka throughout the fight, and Onizuka barely won by split decision. Two of the three judges of the fight were Japanese, and had both scored the bout in favor of Onizuka, making the fight one of the worst and most obvious cases of a hometown decision.

After his controversial fight, Onizuka fought Thanomsak Sithbaobay for the second time, and made his fourth defense by another close 12 round decision. He made a fifth successful defense by 12 round decision on April 10, 1994, despite having been knocked down for the first time in his professional career in the 5th round. Onizuka finally lost in his sixth defense on September 18, 1994 against Hyung-Chul Lee no.1 WBA challenger, where he was trapped in the corner and beaten relentlessly for over a minute by the challenger. The referee finally stopped the fight in the 9th round, and Onizuka lost his title after two years of controversial defenses. He was found to have a detached retina in the right eye after the fight, and announced his retirement. Onizuka explained that he had actually suspected an injury in his right eye over two years ago, but had kept it to himself to avoid being forced into retirement. His record was 24-1-0 (17KOs).

Post retirement
Onizuka lived away from boxing for a while after retirement, but now trains young boxers at his boxing gym in his hometown, Fukuoka. He often appears on TBS boxing broadcasts as a commentator. Fans were reminded of Onizuka's controversial wins when Koki Kameda won a hometown decision to become the WBA Light Flyweight champion in 2006. Both Kameda and Onizuka were trained and managed by the Kyoei boxing gym, and Onizuka has appeared as a commentator in several of Kameda's fights.

See also
List of WBA world champions
List of Japanese boxing world champions
Boxing in Japan

External links
 
 Katsuya Onizuka official site

Sportspeople from Kitakyushu
World Boxing Association champions
World super-flyweight boxing champions
Boxing commentators
World boxing champions
Living people
1970 births
Japanese male boxers
20th-century Japanese people